In the U.S. federal judicial system, the United States is divided into  94 judicial districts. Each state has at least one judicial district, as do the District of Columbia and Puerto Rico. 

Each judicial district contains a United States district court with a bankruptcy court under its authority. There is also a United States Attorney in each district, who acts as the federal government's lawyer in the district, both prosecuting federal criminal cases and defending the government (and its employees) in civil suits against them; the U.S. Attorney is not employed by the judicial branch but by the Department of Justice, part of the executive branch.  There is also a Federal Public Defender who represents people charged with federal crimes who cannot afford to hire their own lawyers; some FPDs cover more than one judicial district. Each district also has a United States Marshal who serves the court system.

Three territories of the United States — the Virgin Islands, Guam, and the Northern Mariana Islands — have district courts that hear federal cases, including bankruptcy cases.  The breakdown of what is in each judicial district is at .Federal judicial districts have also been established in the District of Columbia and Puerto Rico.  Courts in other insular areas are territorial courts under Article I of the Constitution, not United States district courts, although they have similar jurisdiction. Only two districts have jurisdiction over areas outside the state in which the court sits:
The District of Wyoming includes all of Yellowstone National Park, including areas in Montana and Idaho.
The District of Hawaii includes Midway Island, Palmyra Island, and a number of other uninhabited Pacific island possessions of the United States.

Census 1790–1840

From 1790 to 1840 judicial district offices were responsible for census activities, which were in turn conducted by the United States Marshal Service. After the passage of the Census Act of 1840 a central federal census was formed to take charge of census activities.

List of districts
Below is a list of the federal judicial districts and the place(s) where each court "sits" (holds trials) in each district.

References

United States federal judicial districts